The 1936 Currie Cup was the 19th edition of the Currie Cup, the premier domestic rugby union competition in South Africa.

See also

 Currie Cup

References

1936
1936 in South African rugby union
Currie